Ralf Baartmans (born Roosendaal, Netherlands ), better known by his stage name Ralvero, is a Dutch DJ and record producer.

He is a part of Spinnin' Records, the label on which he released most of his singles.

Discography

Singles

Charted singles

Other singles
 2010: In My Bedroom (with Dadz N Effect) [Spinnin' Records]
 2010: Bang Like A (with Bassjackers) [Spinnin' Records]
 2011: Rambo (with Bassjackers) [Spinnin' Records]
 2011: Xtreme [Hysteria Recs (Spinnin')]
 2012: Rage [Hysteria Recs (Spinnin')]
 2013: Jackpot (with Quintino) [Spinnin' Records]
 2013: Fuck What U Heard [Hysteria Recs (Spinnin')]
 2014: Spicebomb (featuring Nicci) [Hysteria Recs]
 2014: Hayao (with Dropgun) [DOORN (Spinnin')]
 2014: Noise [Oxygen]
 2014: District [Revealed Recordings]
 2014: Mayday [Oxygen]
 2015: Rock The World [Metanoia Music (Arisa Audio)]
 2015: Supa Woofa [Oxygen]
 2015: Dreamin' (with Kill The Buzz) [Revealed Recordings]
 2015: Trivia (with Jimmy Clash) [Oxygen]
 2015: Mad (with Karim Mika) [Revealed]
 2015: Generation [SKINK]
 2015: Party People 2k15 [DOORN (Spinnin')]
 2016: U Got 2 Know [Maxximize Records]
 2016: Hunkaar [Armada Zouk]
 2016: Run Wild (featuring Ina) [Mixmash Records]
 2017: XOXO (with Laidback Luke featuring Ina) [Mixmash Records]
 2017: Bubblegum (with Redhead Roman) [Mixmash Deep]

References

Notes
 A  Did not enter the Single Top 100 or Ultratop 50, but peaked on the Dance chart.

Sources

External links
 
 Beatport

1986 births
Dutch dance musicians
Dutch DJs
Dutch record producers
Living people
People from Roosendaal